Sarbakan is a Canadian video game studio based in Quebec City, Quebec. Ten years after its foundation in 1998 by Guy Boucher, Sarbakan had delivered over 600 games, mostly web-based, and started shifting its focus from flash game development to console digital download gaming.

In 2010, Sarbakan began collaborating with Disney Interactive Studios and other studios to make games for iOS and Android platforms. Where's My Water won multiple awards including 'Game of the Year' by Pocket Gamer., and in 2012 the iPhone "Apple Design Award" during WWDC. In 2013 the company would be acquired by Adrenaline Amusements, but was later split off in 2016 and acquired by Japanese holding company YE&U Corporation the following year.

Games developed & co-developed

2012-2016

2011
 Captain America: Sentinel of Liberty (iOS/Android)
 Scene It? - Movie Night (XBLA/PSN)
 iCarly: iSock it to 'Em (iOS)
 Johnny Test (Nintendo DS)
 Dora's Creativity Center (iOS)
2010
 Wizards of Waverly Place: Spellbound (Nintendo DS)
 Little Noir Stories – The Case of the Missing Girl (Downloadable)
 Lazy Raiders (XBLA)
2009
 Wedding Dash: Ready, Aim, Love! (Downloadable): Star Fever Agency (Social MMO) 
 Dora's Lost and Found Adventure (Downloadable)
 Where's Waldo? The Fantastic Journey (Nintendo DS)
2008
 The Game of Life – Path to Success (Downloadable)
 The Game of Life – Classic (Downloadable)
 Monopoly – SpongeBob SquarePants Edition (Downloadable)
 The Game of Life – SpongeBob SquarePants Edition (Downloadable/Retail)
 Wedding Dash 2 – Rings Around the World (Downloadable/Retail)
 Fitness Dash (Downloadable)
 School House Shuffle (Downloadable)
 Wordmaster (Nintendo DS)
 Horseland (Nintendo DS)
 Huru Humi – Huru High (Online community)
 Slimeball Multiplayer (Downloadable) 
 Scrabble (Downloadable)
 Yahtzee Texas Hold’em (Downloadable)
 NightMares the Adventures (Online)
2005
 Operation Victory (Downloadable)
2004
 FireChild (Online)
2002
 Houdini: Master of the Extraordinary (Online)
2001
 Steppenwolf: The X-Creatures Project (Online episodic game – 24 episodes)
1999
 Good Night Mr. Snoozleberg (Online episodic game – 8 episodes)
 Arcane – Online Mystery Serial (Online episodic game – 12 episodes)

References

External links 

 Official website

Video game development companies
Video game companies established in 1998
1998 establishments in Quebec
Companies based in Quebec City
Video game companies of Canada